Feltiella acarisuga is a species of predatory gall midges which will feed on various species of spider mites. It is especially common when spider mites occur in colonies. It requires a high spider mite density and high humidities to become established.

Mode of action
Adult gall-midges search for spider mite colonies actively and deposit eggs next to the spider mites. The larvae that hatch feed on spider mite eggs and suck them empty. It takes one week for the eggs to develop to mature larvae. The pupal stage takes approximately one week. Spider mites that are killed by the gall-midge shrivel up and become brown or black. Dozens of larvae can be found per spider mite infested leaf. White cocoons can be visible along the veins of the leaf.

Use in biocontrol 
Feltiella acarisuga can be used to manage spider mite populations in a variety of greenhouse and field crops. Each midge larva can consume an average of least 15 adult mites, 30 mixed developmental stages, or 80 eggs per day. F. acarisuga has been extremely effective for controlling spider mites on tomato, pepper and cucumber. F. acarisuga is also used to manage spider mites on strawberries and various ornamental crops.

References

External links 
 Feltiella acarisuga, a predatory gall midge on the UF / IFAS Featured Creatures Web site

Cecidomyiinae
Diptera used as pest control agents
Insects described in 1827